The sixteenth season of Food Paradise, an American food reality television series narrated by Jess Blaze Snider on the Travel Channel, premiered on June 3, 2018. First-run episodes of the series aired in the United States on the Travel Channel on Mondays at 10:00 p.m. EDT. The season contained 9 episodes and concluded airing on August 21, 2018.

Food Paradise features the best places to find various cuisines at food locations across America. Each episode focuses on a certain type of restaurant, such as "Diners", "Bars", "Drive-Thrus" or "Breakfast" places that people go to find a certain food specialty.

Episodes

Food Hall of Fame

Nacho Nation

Easy as Pie

Sandwich Heroes

Flavor Fiesta!

Hottest Dogs

Eat Like a Local: California

Swine and Dine

Viva Las Vegas

References

External links
Food Paradise @Travelchannel.com

2018 American television seasons